Bartonsville is an unincorporated community and census-designated place (CDP) in Frederick County, in the U.S. state of Maryland. As of the 2020 census it had a population of 2,753. Prior to 2010, the area was part of the Linganore-Bartonsville CDP.

Geography
The community is in southeastern Frederick County, bordered to the north by Maryland Route 144 (Old National Pike), to the east by Ijamsville Road, and to the west by the Monocacy River.

Demographics

Notable person
Lester Bowie, jazz trumpeter born in Bartonsville

References

Census-designated places in Frederick County, Maryland
Census-designated places in Maryland